Baputa dichroa is a moth of the family Noctuidae. It is found on New Guinea.

References

Moths described in 1877
Calpinae